Rohan Bopanna and Aisam-ul-Haq Qureshi were the defending champions but Bopanna decided not to participate.
Qureshi played alongside Jean-Julien Rojer.
Marcelo Melo and Bruno Soares won the final 6–7(4–7), 7–5, [10–6] against Robert Lindstedt and Nenad Zimonjić.

Seeds

Draw

Draw

References
 Main Draw

Doubles